Long Point is a rural community in Kings County, New Brunswick, Canada. It is connected to the community of Kars via the Belleisle Bay Ferry year round.

History

Notable people

See also
 List of communities in New Brunswick

References 

Communities in Kings County, New Brunswick